Cosmo Lady (China) Holdings Company Limited  (HKSE: 2298), doing business as Cosmo Lady is a Chinese company, headquartered in Dongguan, that manufactures underwear;  it is the largest such company in the country. In 2014 it was the largest such company, if operating revenue is the method of measurement, with its own brand. It operates some retail shops selling its own products.   Zheng Yaonan is the chairperson.

History
The brand was established in 1998 and the current corporation was established in 2009.

Historically the company sold only women's underwear. In 2014 the company had considered steps to also begin selling such products for male consumers. That year it made an initial public offering and effective 26 June 2014 was listed on the main board of the Hong Kong Stock Exchange (HKSE).

In 2019 there was an expected loss of 140 million USD, and possible plans to close retail stores.

Corporate affairs
Its head office, the City Beauty Industrial Park, is in Fengdeling Village, Fenggang Town, Dongnan District, Dongguan. It moved to its current headquarters in 2010.

See also
 Threegun - Chinese clothing manufacturer based in Shanghai

References

Further reading

External links
 Cosmo Lady (retail) 
 Cosmo Lady (corporate, Hong Kong)

Textile companies of China
Underwear brands
Lingerie brands
Companies based in Dongguan